Judith Frances Dunn,  (born 1939) is a British psychologist and academic, who specialises in social developmental psychology.

Early life and education
Dunn was the daughter of James Pace and Jean Stewart. She studied at New Hall, Cambridge, graduating with a Bachelor of Arts (BA) degree in 1962; as per tradition, her BA was promoted to a Master of Arts (MA Cantab) degree in 1968. While a fellow of King's College, Cambridge, she undertook postgraduate research and she completed her Doctor of Philosophy (PhD) degree in 1982.

Academic career
From 1978 to 1986, Dunn was a Fellow of King's College, Cambridge, and a Medical Research Council Senior Scientific Officer. From 1986 to 1995, she was Professor of Human Development at Pennsylvania State University. In 1994, she was made an Evan Pugh Professor; an Evan Pugh Professorship is the "highest honor the institution can give to a member of its faculty". From 1995 to 2012, she was Professor of Developmental Psychology at the Institute of Psychiatry, King's College, London.

Dunn specializes in children's social emotional and sociocognitive development, parent-child, sibling and peer relationships, and the development of language and communication abilities.

Other work
Dunn is Chair of The Children's Society's Good Childhood Inquiry, established in 2006, which explores and measures children’s subjective well-being.

Personal life
In 1961, the then Judith Pace married Martin Gardiner Bernal, a British scholar of modern Chinese political history who also wrote the controversial Black Athena; Together, they had one daughter and twin sons. They later divorced. From 1973 to 1987, she was married to John Montfort Dunn, a British political theorist, before they too divorced. In 1987, she married the American psychologist Robert Plomin.

Honours
In 1996, Dunn was elected a Fellow of the British Academy (FBA), the United Kingdom's national academy for humanities and social sciences. In 2000, she was elected a Fellow of the Academy of Medical Sciences (FMedSci).

Selected works

References

Academics of King's College London
1939 births
Living people
British psychologists
Developmental psychologists
British women psychologists
Fellows of the British Academy
Fellows of the Academy of Medical Sciences (United Kingdom)
Fellows of King's College, Cambridge
Pennsylvania State University faculty
Alumni of New Hall, Cambridge
Alumni of King's College, Cambridge
Fellows of King's College London